The 1955 USC Trojans football team represented the University of Southern California (USC) in the 1955 college football season. In their fifth year under head coach Jess Hill, the Trojans compiled a 6–4 record (3–3 against conference opponents), finished in sixth place in the Pacific Coast Conference, and outscored their opponents by a combined total of 265 to 158. Attendance at seven home games was 464,104, an average of 66,300. Attendance at all 10 games was 615,196.

Jim Contratto led the team in passing with 22 of 55 passes completed for 406 yards, five touchdowns and five interceptions. Jon Arnett led the team in rushing with 141 carries for 672 yards and 11 touchdowns. Arnett was also the team's leading punt returners with 16 returns and an average of 17.6 yards per return, including one returned for a touchdown. With three touchdown catches, Arnett also led the team with 15 touchdowns and 105 points scored. Leon Clarke was the leading receiver with 15 catches for 215 yards and two touchdowns.

Two Trojans received first-team honors from the Associated Press on the 1955 All-Pacific Coast Conference football team: back Jon Arnett and guard Orlando Ferrante.  Arnett was also a two-time recipient of the W. J. Voit Memorial Trophy as the outstanding football player on the Pacific Coast, winning the award in both 1954 and 1955.  He was inducted into the USC Athletic Hall of Fame in 1994 and the College Football Hall of Fame in 2001.

Schedule

Players
The following players were members of the 1955 USC football team.
 Fabian Abram, tackle
 Jon Arnett, junior tailback #26 ("led the team in total offense, punt returns, kickoff returns, punting, rushing, scoring and in total playing time")
 George Belotti, tackle
 Bing Bordier, end
 Ron Brown, back
 Leon Clarke, end (the first PCC player to be selected in the 1956 NFL Draft, selected 14th overall by the Los Angeles Rams)
 Jim Contratto, quarterback
 Gordon Duvall, back (offense) and linebacker (defense)
 Dick Eldredge, center
 Dick Enright, tackle
 Orlando Ferrante, guard (All-PCC, 62 unassisted tackles, 41 assists)
 Ron Fletcher, tackle
 George Galli, guard (co-captain)
 Marv Goux (co-captain)
 Frank Hall, quarterback
 Don Hickman
 Bob Isaacson
 Ludwig Keehn, end
 Ells Kissinger, quarterback
 Doug Kranz, halfback
 Chuck Leimbach, end
 Don McFarland
 Ernie Merk (set a USC record with a 93-yard punt return against Minnesota)
 John Miller, guard
 Chuck Perpich
 Fred Pierce, left halfback
 C. R. Roberts, fullback
 Karl Rubke, center
 Vern Sampson, lineman
 Roy Smith, tackle
 Joe Tisdale
 Laird Willott, guard
 Dick Westphal
 Ernie Zampese, tailback

Coaching staff and other personnel
 Head coach: Jess Hill
 Assistant coaches: Nick Pappas (defensive backs), Don Clark (line coach), George Ceithaml (offensive backfield coach), Mel Hein (line coach), Bill Fisk (end coach), Jess Mortensen (freshman coach)
 Senior manager: Jim Maddux
 Yell kings: Bill Hillinck, Kent Blanche, Al Green, Woody Wilmore, Larry Knudsen

References

USC
USC Trojans football seasons
USC Trojans football